Earthquakes in 2010 resulted in nearly 165,000 fatalities. Most of these were due to the 2010 Haiti earthquake, which caused an estimated 160,000 deaths, making it the 8th deadliest earthquake in recorded history. Other deadly quakes occurred in China, Indonesia or Turkey. The 2010 Chile earthquake registered 8.8 on the moment magnitude scale, ranking it as the 6th strongest earthquake since 1900. The tsunami associated with the Chile earthquake caused tsunami advisories and warning across the entire Ocean rim, also known as the Ring of Fire.

Compared to other years

Overall

By death toll

 Note: At least 10 dead

By magnitude

 Note: At least 7.0 magnitude

By month

January

The earthquake left 20,000 homeless, and around 1,000 houses were damaged, 98 of which collapsed.
Several people were injured, and many were left homeless by a tsunami, which reached heights of between 3 and 7 metres (10 and 23 ft).
  A magnitude 6.8 earthquake struck the Solomon Islands on January 5.
  A magnitude 6.0 earthquake struck the Solomon Islands on January 5.
Dozens of injuries were reported, but no deaths have been confirmed.
  A magnitude 5.1 earthquake struck Java, Indonesia on January 10, killing one person.
  A magnitude 4.4 earthquake struck Guizhou, China on January 10, killing 8 people.
  A magnitude 6.2 earthquake struck Illapel, Chile on January 18.
  A magnitude 6.1 earthquake struck Concepción on January 21.
  A magnitude 6.8 earthquake struck Antofagasta, Chile on January 28.
  A magnitude 5.1 earthquake struck Eastern Sichuan, China on January 30, killing one person.

February 

  A magnitude 6.2 earthquake struck the Papua New Guinea on February 1.
  A magnitude 6.2 earthquake occurred in the South Indian Ocean on February 5.
  A magnitude 6.0 earthquake struck the Kuril Islands on February 6.
  A magnitude 6.3 earthquake struck off the coast of the Yaeyama Islands on February 7.
  A magnitude 6.1 earthquake struck American Samoa on February 9.
  A magnitude 6.1 earthquake struck Tonga on February 13.
  A magnitude 6.2 earthquake struck the Banda Sea, Indonesia on February 15.
  A magnitude 6.9 earthquake struck the China, Russia, North Korea region at a depth of 573.8 km.
  A magnitude 6.0 earthquake struck Eureka, California on February 4, with minor injuries and damage.
  A magnitude 6.0 earthquake struck Tonga on February 22.
  A magnitude 7.0 earthquake struck the Ryukyu Islands on February 26, causing some damage and two injuries. A tsunami warning was issued for the Okinawa prefecture.
  A magnitude 8.8 earthquake struck Chile on February 27, with 525 confirmed deaths. A tsunami alert was waived over all countries of the Pacific Rim.
  A magnitude 6.3 earthquake struck Salta, Argentina on February 28, killing 2 people. It is unknown whether it was related to the Chilean earthquake.
 note: A number of large aftershocks were recorded following the magnitude 8.8 earthquake that struck Chile on February 27. In order to eliminate cluttering, the February aftershocks have not been included.

March

  A magnitude 6.4 earthquake struck Kaohsiung, Taiwan on March 3, resulting in at least 90+ injuries and minor damage.
  A magnitude 6.0 earthquake stuck Valparaiso, Chile on March 4.
  A magnitude 6.5 earthquake struck Vanuatu on March 4, at a depth of 176 km.
  A magnitude 6.3 earthquake struck Calama, Chile on March 4.
  A magnitude 6.1 earthquake struck Talcahuano, Chile on March 5.
  A magnitude 6.6 earthquake struck Talcahuano, Chile on March 5.
  A magnitude 6.8 earthquake struck Sumatra, Indonesia on March 5.
  A magnitude 6.3 earthquakes struck offshore the Pitcairn Islands on March 7.
  A magnitude 6.1 earthquake struck Elazığ, Turkey on March 8, killing 58 people.
  A magnitude 6.1 earthquake struck the Mariana Islands on March 8.
  A magnitude 6.9 earthquake struck Pichilemu, Chile on March 11. One person died of a heart attack. It struck as the new president was being inaugurated into office.
  A magnitude 6.7 earthquake struck Pichilemu, Chile on March 11.
  A magnitude 6.0 earthquake struck Pichilemu, Chile on March 11.
  A magnitude 6.4 earthquake struck Kepulauan Obi, Indonesia on March 14.
  A magnitude 6.5 earthquake struck off the coast of Honshu, Japan on March 14.
  A magnitude 6.2 earthquake struck Biobío, Chile on March 15.
  A magnitude 6.6 earthquake struck New Ireland, Papua New Guinea on March 20.
  A magnitude 6.0 earthquake struck Mindoro, Philippines on March 25.
  A magnitude 6.3 earthquake struck Atacama on March 26.
  A magnitude 6.6 earthquake struck the Andaman Islands on March 30.

April

  A magnitude 6.0 earthquake struck Biobío on April 2.
  A magnitude 7.2 earthquake struck the Mexicali Valley in Baja California on April 4, killing 4 people and leaving more than 254 injured.
  A magnitude 6.2 earthquake struck the Molucca Sea on April 5.
  A magnitude 7.8 earthquake struck Sumatra on April 6.
  A magnitude 6.0 earthquake struck Northern Papua New Guinea on April 7.
  A magnitude 6.0 earthquake struck Tonga on April 10.
  A magnitude 6.8 earthquake struck the Solomon Islands on April 11.
  A magnitude 6.3 earthquake struck Dúrcal, Granada, Spain on April 11.
  A magnitude 6.9 earthquake struck Yushu, China on April 13, killing 2,968 people.
  A magnitude 6.1 earthquake struck Yushu, China on April 14.
  A magnitude 6.3 earthquake struck eastern New Guinea on April 17.
  A magnitude 5.6 earthquake struck Central Afghanistan on April 18, killing 11 people.
  A magnitude 6.1 earthquake struck American Samoa on April 21.
  A magnitude 6.0 earthquake struck Biobío, Chile on April 23.
  A magnitude 6.1 earthquake struck Indonesia on April 24.
  A magnitude 6.0 earthquake struck Taiwan on April 26.
  A magnitude 6.5 earthquake occurred in the Bering Sea on April 30.
  A magnitude 6.3 earthquake occurred in the Bering Sea on April 30.

May

  A magnitude 6.1 earthquake struck the Bonin Islands on May 3.
  A magnitude 6.3 earthquake struck Biobío on May 3.
  A magnitude 6.5 earthquake struck Southern Sumatra, Indonesia on May 5.
  A magnitude 6.2 earthquake struck Tacna, Peru on May 6.
  A magnitude 7.2 earthquake struck Northern Sumatra, Indonesia on May 9.
  A magnitude 5.2 earthquake struck Northern Algeria on May 14, killing 2 people.
  A magnitude 6.0 earthquake struck Northern Peru on May 19.
  A magnitude 6.0 earthquake occurred in the South Pacific Ocean on May 19.
  A magnitude 6.0 earthquake occurred in the South Pacific Ocean on May 19.
  A magnitude 6.1 earthquake struck Central Peru on May 23.
  A magnitude 6.5 earthquake struck Acre, Brazil on May 24.
  A magnitude 6.3 earthquake struck the Azores on May 25.
  A magnitude 6.4 earthquake hit the Ryukyu Islands on May 26.
  A magnitude 7.1 earthquake struck Vanuatu on May 27.
  A magnitude 6.1 earthquake struck Vanuatu on May 27.
  A magnitude 6.0 earthquake struck Mindanao, Philippines on May 31.
  A magnitude 6.5 earthquake struck the Andaman Islands on May 31.

June

  A magnitude 6.0 earthquake struck Costa Rica on June 1.
  A magnitude 6.0 earthquake struck Vanuatu on June 9.
  A magnitude 7.5 earthquake struck the Nicobar Islands, India on June 12.
  A magnitude 6.2 earthquake struck the coast Papua, Indonesia on June 16.
  A magnitude 7.0 earthquake struck the coast near Papua, Indonesia on June 16, killing 17 and damaging hundreds of homes.
  A magnitude 6.6 earthquake struck the coast near Papua, Indonesia on June 16.
  A magnitude 6.0 earthquake struck 135 miles SSW of L'Esperance Rock, Kermadec Islands on June 17.
  A magnitude 6.2 earthquake struck the Kuril Islands on June 18.
  A magnitude 5.0 earthquake struck  Quebec, Canada on June 23.
  A magnitude 6.1 earthquake struck the New Britain region of Papua New Guinea on June 24.
  A magnitude 6.7 earthquake struck the Solomon Islands on June 26.
  A magnitude 6.4 earthquake struck south of Fiji on June 30.
  A magnitude 6.2 earthquake struck Oaxaca, Mexico, on June 30, killing one person.

July

  A magnitude 6.3 earthquake struck in the Vanuatu region on July 2.
  A magnitude 6.3 earthquake struck near the east coast of Honshu on July 4.
  A magnitude 6.3 earthquake struck south of the Mariana Islands on July 10.
  A magnitude 6.3 earthquake struck Calama, Chile on July 12.
  A magnitude 6.5 earthquake struck Bío Bío, Chile on July 14.
  A magnitude 6.7 earthquake struck the Fox Islands, Alaska on July 18.
  A magnitude 6.9 earthquake struck the New Britain Region, Papua New Guinea on July 18.
  A magnitude 7.3 earthquake struck the New Britain Region, Papua New Guinea on July 18.
  A magnitude 6.0 earthquake struck the Fox Islands, Alaska on July 18.
  A magnitude 5.8 earthquake struck Southern Iran on July 20, killing 1 person.
  A magnitude 6.3 earthquake struck the New Britain Region, Papua New Guinea on July 20.
  A magnitude 6.1 earthquake struck Indonesia on July 21.
  A magnitude 6.1 earthquake struck Vanuatu, on July 22.
  A magnitude 7.3 earthquake struck Mindanao, Philippines on July 23.
  A magnitude 7.6 earthquake struck Mindanao, Philippines on July 23.
  A magnitude 7.4 earthquake struck Mindanao, Philippines on July 23.
  A magnitude 6.5 earthquake struck Mindanao, Philippines on July 24.
  A magnitude 6.6 earthquake struck Mindanao, Philippines on July 29.
  A magnitude 6.3 earthquake struck off the coast of Kamchatka, Russia on July 30.
  A magnitude 5.6 earthquake struck Northeastern Iran on July 30.

August

  A magnitude 6.3 earthquake struck the Molucca Sea on August 3.
  A magnitude 6.0 earthquake struck Tonga on August 4.
  A magnitude 6.5 earthquake struck Papua New Guinea on August 4.
  A magnitude 6.4 earthquake struck the Aleutian Islands, Alaska on August 4.
  A magnitude 7.0 earthquake struck New Britain, Papua New Guinea on August 4.
  A magnitude 6.0 earthquake struck the Kuril Islands on August 4.
  A magnitude 7.3 earthquake struck Vanuatu on August 10.
  A magnitude 7.1 earthquake struck Pastaza Province in Ecuador on August 12.
  A magnitude 6.9 earthquake struck the Mariana Islands on August 13.
  A magnitude 6.2 earthquake struck the Mariana Islands on August 14.
  A magnitude 6.6 earthquake struck the Mariana Islands on August 14.
  A magnitude 6.3 earthquake struck New Britain, Papua New Guinea on August 15.
  A magnitude 6.3 earthquake struck Réunion on August 16.
  A magnitude 6.2 earthquake struck the Fiji on August 16.
  A magnitude 6.3 earthquake struck the Mariana Islands on August 18.
  A magnitude 6.1 earthquake struck Papua New Guinea on August 20.
  A magnitude 6.1 earthquake struck Jalisco, Mexico on August 23.
  A magnitude 5.7 earthquake struck Damghan in northern Iran on August 27. This killed 3 people and also injured 40 others.

September

  A magnitude 6.5 earthquake struck the Andreanof Islands, Alaska on September 3.
  A magnitude 7.1 earthquake struck the Canterbury region of New Zealand's South Island on September 4, killing 2 people.
  A magnitude 6.3 earthquake struck Tonga on September 4.
  A magnitude 6.3 earthquake struck in the Fiji region on September 7.
  A magnitude 6.2 earthquake struck Vanuatu, on September 8.
  A magnitude 6.3 earthquake struck Biobío Region, Chile, on September 9.
  A magnitude 6.3 earthquake struck Hindu Kush, Afghanistan on September 17.
  A magnitude 5.8 earthquake struck southern Iran on September 26, killing 1 person.
  A magnitude 6.0 earthquake stuck near the south coast of Papua, Indonesia on September 26.
  A magnitude 6.2 earthquake struck near the south coast of Papua, Indonesia on September 29.
  A magnitude 7.2 earthquake struck near the south coast of Papua, Indonesia on September 29.

October

  A magnitude 6.3 earthquake struck the Ryukyu Islands, Japan on October 4.
  A magnitude 6.4 earthquake struck the Andreanof Islands, Alaska, on October 8.
  A magnitude 6.0 earthquake struck the Andreanof Islands, Alaska, on October 8.
  A magnitude 6.2 earthquake struck Halmahera, Indonesia on October 8.
  A magnitude 5.2 earthquake struck Pakistan on October 10, killing 1 person.
  A magnitude 6.3 earthquake struck Tonga on October 12.
  A magnitude 6.1 earthquake struck the Kepulauan Barat Daya region of Indonesia on October 17.
  A magnitude 6.7 earthquake struck Los Mochis in the Gulf of California, Mexico, on October 21.
  A magnitude 6.1 earthquake struck the Molucca Sea on October 25.
  A magnitude 7.7 earthquake struck Sumatra, Indonesia on October 25, killing 408 and leaving 303 people missing.
  A magnitude 6.3 earthquake struck Sumatra, Indonesia on October 25.
 A magnitude 6.4 earthquake struck the Pacific-Antarctic Ridge on October 30.

November

  A magnitude 5.3 earthquake struck Kraljevo, Serbia on November 3, killing 2 and injuring over 100.
  A magnitude 6.0 earthquake struck near the south coast of Papua, Indonesia on November 3.
  A magnitude 6.1 earthquake struck Tonga on November 3.
  A magnitude 4.9 earthquake struck western Iran, injuring 100 people.
 A magnitude 6.5 earthquake struck the Southeast Indian Ridge on November 10.
 A magnitude 6.0 earthquake occurred in the South Pacific Ocean on November 21.
  A magnitude 6.1 earthquake struck Papua New Guinea on November 23.
  A magnitude 6.8 earthquake struck the Bonin Islands, Japan on November 30.

December

  A magnitude 6.1 earthquake struck the Fiji region on December 1.
  A magnitude 6.7 earthquake struck the New Britain region of Papua New Guinea on December 2.
  A magnitude 6.5 earthquake struck the South Sandwich Islands region on December 8.
  A magnitude 6.2 earthquake struck Bougainville Island, Papua New Guinea on December 13.
  A magnitude 6.7 earthquake struck Southeastern Iran on December 20, killing 11 and injuring 100+, also damaging 1,800+ homes.
  A magnitude 6.0 earthquake struck the Molucca Sea on December 15.
  A magnitude 5.1 earthquake struck Ethiopia on December 19, injuring 26 and causing extensive damage.
  A magnitude 7.4 earthquake struck Bonin Islands, Japan Region on December 21.
  A magnitude 6.4 earthquake struck the Bonin Islands, Japan Region on December 22.
  A magnitude 6.4 earthquake struck the Aleutian Islands, Alaska on December 23.
  A magnitude 5.1 earthquake struck Puerto Rico on December 24.
  A magnitude 7.3 earthquake struck the South Pacific region near Vanuatu on December 25.
  A magnitude 6.0 earthquake struck Vanuatu on December 26.
  A magnitude 6.3 earthquake struck the Fiji islands on December 28.
  A magnitude 6.4 earthquake struck Vanuatu on December 29.
  A magnitude 5.0 earthquake struck Poland on December 30. Three miners were killed by falling rocks.

See also
 List of 21st century earthquakes

References

2010
2010